Euro gold and silver commemorative coins are special euro coins minted and issued by member states of the Eurozone, mainly in gold and silver, although other precious metals are also used on rare occasions. Slovakia is scheduled to introduced the euro (€) on 1 January 2009. The National Bank of Slovakia, together with the Kremnica Mint, will be issuing both normal issues of Slovak euro coins, which are intended for circulation, and commemorative euro coins in gold and silver.

These special coins have a legal tender only in Slovakia, unlike the normal issues of the Slovak euro coins, which have a legal tender in every country of the Eurozone. This means that the commemorative coins made of gold and silver cannot be used as money in other countries. Furthermore, as their bullion value generally vastly exceeds their face value, these coins are not intended to be used as means of payment at all—although it remains possible. For this reason, they are usually named Collectors' coins.

The coins usually commemorate the anniversaries of historical events or draw attention to current events of special importance. Slovakia has announced that two of these coins will be minted in 2009, both in silver, with face value of 10 and 20 euros.

Summary 

As of 9 October 2008, 2 variations of Slovak commemorative coins have been scheduled to be minted in 2009. These special high-value commemorative coins are not to be confused with €2 commemorative coins, which are coins designated for circulation and do have legal tender status in all countries of the Eurozone.

The following table shows the number of coins minted per year. In the first section, the coins are grouped by the metal used, while in the second section they are grouped by their face value.

2009 coinage

2010 coinage

References

Slovakia
Coins of Slovakia